Light therapy, also called phototherapy or bright light therapy is intentional daily exposure to direct sunlight or similar-intensity artificial light in order to treat medical disorders, especially seasonal affective disorder (SAD) and circadian rhythm sleep-wake disorders. Treating skin conditions such as neurodermatitis, psoriasis, acne vulgaris, and eczema with ultraviolet light is called ultraviolet light therapy.

Medical uses

Nutrient deficiency

Vitamin D deficiency 
Exposure to light to wavelengths of 290-300 nanometer enables the body to produce vitamin D3 to treat vitamin D3 deficiency. Ultraviolet B Light Emitting Diodes (LEDs) Are More Efficient and Effective in Producing Vitamin D3 in Human Skin Compared to Natural Sunlight

Skin conditions 

Light therapy treatments for the skin usually involve exposure to ultraviolet light. The exposures can be to a small area of the skin or over the whole body surface, as in a tanning bed. The most common treatment is with narrowband UVB, which has a wavelength of approximately 311–313 nanometers. Full body phototherapy can be delivered at a doctor's office or at home using a large high-power UVB booth.  Tanning beds, however, generate mostly UVA light, and only 4% to 10% of tanning-bed light is in the UVB spectrum.

Acne vulgaris 
 evidence for light therapy and lasers in the treatment of acne vulgaris was not sufficient to recommend them. There is moderate evidence for the efficacy of blue and blue-red light therapies in treating mild acne, but most studies are of low quality. While light therapy appears to provide short-term benefit, there is a lack of long-term outcome data or data in those with severe acne.

Atopic dermatitis 
Light therapy is considered one of the best monotherapy treatments for atopic dermatitis (AD) when applied to patients who have not responded to traditional topical treatments. The therapy offers a wide range of options: UVA1 for acute AD, NB-UVB for chronic AD, and balneophototherapy have proven their efficacy. Patients tolerate the therapy safely but, as in any therapy, there are potential adverse effects and care must be taken in its application, particularly to children.

Cancer 
According to the American Cancer Society, there is some evidence that ultraviolet light therapy may be effective in helping treat certain kinds of skin cancer, and ultraviolet blood irradiation therapy is established for this application. However, alternative uses of light for cancer treatment – light box therapy and colored light therapy – are not supported by evidence. Photodynamic therapy (often with red light) is used to treat certain superficial non-melanoma skin cancers.

Psoriasis 

For psoriasis, UVB phototherapy has been shown to be effective. A feature of psoriasis is localized inflammation mediated by the immune system. Ultraviolet radiation is known to suppress the immune system and reduce inflammatory responses. Light therapy for skin conditions like psoriasis usually use 313 nanometer  UVB though it may use UVA (315–400 nm wavelength) or a broader spectrum UVB (280–315 nm wavelength). UVA combined with psoralen, a drug taken orally, is known as PUVA treatment. In UVB phototherapy the exposure time is very short, seconds to minutes depending on intensity of lamps and the person's skin pigment and sensitivity.

Vitiligo 
About 1% of the human population has vitiligo which causes painless distinct light-colored patches of the skin on the face, hands, and legs. Phototherapy is an effective treatment because it forces skin cells to manufacture melanin to protect the body from UV damage. Prescribed treatment is generally 3 times a week in a clinic or daily at home. About 1 month usually results in re-pigmentation in the face and neck, and 2–4 months in the hands and legs. Narrowband UVB is more suitable to the face and neck and PUVA is more effective at the hands and legs.

Wound healing 
Low level laser therapy has been studied as a potential treatment for chronic wounds, and higher-power lasers have sometimes been successfully used to close acute wounds as an alternative to stitching. However,  and due to inconsistent results and the low quality of extant research, reviews in the scientific literature have not supported its widespread application.

Other skin conditions 
Some types of phototherapy may be effective in the treatment of polymorphous light eruption, cutaneous T-cell lymphoma and lichen planus. Narrowband UVB between 311 and 313 nanometers is the most common treatment.

Retinal conditions 
There is preliminary evidence that light therapy is an effective treatment for diabetic retinopathy and diabetic macular oedema.

Mood and sleep related

Seasonal affective disorder 

The effectiveness of light therapy for treating seasonal affective disorder (SAD) may be linked to the fact that light therapy makes up for lost sunlight exposure and resets the body's internal clock. Studies show that light therapy helps reduce the debilitating and depressive behaviors of SAD, such as excessive sleepiness and fatigue, with results lasting for at least 1 month. Light therapy is preferred over antidepressants in the treatment of SAD because it is a relatively safe and easy therapy. Two methods of light therapy, bright light and dawn simulation, have similar success rates in the treatment of SAD.

It is possible that response to light therapy for SAD could be season dependent. Morning therapy has provided the best results because light in the early morning aids in regulating the circadian rhythm. People affected by SAD have low levels of energy and have difficulty concentrating. They usually have a change in appetite and experience trouble sleeping.

A 2007 systematic review by the Swedish agency SBU found insufficient evidence that light therapy was able to alleviate symptoms of depression or seasonal affective disorder. The report recommended that: "Approximately 100 participants are required to establish whether the therapy is moderately more effective than placebo". Although treatment in light therapy rooms was well established in Sweden, no satisfactory, controlled studies had been published on the subject. This led to the closure of a number of clinics offering light therapy in Sweden.

A Cochrane review conducted in 2019 states the evidence that light therapy's effectiveness as a treatment for the prevention of seasonal affective disorder is limited, although the risk of adverse effects are minimal. Therefore, the decision to use light therapy should be based on a person's preference of treatment.

Non-seasonal depression 
Light therapy has also been suggested in the treatment of non-seasonal depression and other psychiatric mood disturbances, including major depressive disorder, bipolar disorder and postpartum depression. A meta-analysis by the Cochrane Collaboration concluded that "for patients suffering from non-seasonal depression, light therapy offers modest though promising antidepressive efficacy." A 2008 systematic review concluded that "overall, bright light therapy is an excellent candidate for inclusion into the therapeutic inventory available for the treatment of nonseasonal depression today, as adjuvant therapy to antidepressant medication, or eventually as stand-alone treatment for specific subgroups of depressed patients." A 2015 review found that supporting evidence for light therapy was limited due to serious methodological flaws.

A 2016 meta-analysis showed that bright light therapy appeared to be efficacious, particularly when administered for 2–5 weeks' duration and as monotherapy.

Chronic circadian rhythm sleep disorders (CRSD)
In the management of circadian rhythm disorders such as delayed sleep phase disorder (DSPD), the timing of light exposure is critical. Light exposure administered to the eyes before or after the nadir of the core body temperature rhythm can affect the phase response curve. Use upon awakening may also be effective for non-24-hour sleep–wake disorder. Some users have reported success with lights that turn on shortly before awakening (dawn simulation). Evening use is recommended for people with advanced sleep phase disorder. Some, but not all, totally blind people whose retinae are intact, may benefit from light therapy.

Circadian rhythm sleep disorders and jet lag

Situational CRSD
Light therapy has been tested for individuals with shift work sleep disorder and for jet lag.

Sleep disorder in Parkinson's disease 
Light therapy has been trialed in treating sleep disorders experienced by patients with Parkinson's disease.

Sleep disorder in Alzheimer's disease 
Studies have shown that daytime and evening light therapy for nursing home patients with Alzheimer's disease, who often struggle with agitation and fragmented wake/rest cycles effectively led to more consolidated sleep and an increase in circadian rhythm stability.

Neonatal jaundice (Postnatal Jaundice) 

Light therapy is used to treat cases of neonatal jaundice. Bilirubin, a yellow pigment normally formed in the liver during the breakdown of old red blood cells, cannot always be effectively cleared by a neonate's liver causing neonatal jaundice. Accumulation of excess bilirubin can cause central nervous system damage, and so this buildup of bilirubin must be treated. Phototherapy uses the energy from light to isomerize the bilirubin and consequently transform it into compounds that the newborn can excrete via urine and stools. Bilirubin is most successful absorbing light in the blue region of the visible light spectrum, which falls between 460 and 490 nm. Therefore, light therapy technologies that utilize these blue wavelengths are the most successful at isomerizing bilirubin.

Techniques

Photodynamic therapy 

Photodynamic therapy is a form of phototherapy using nontoxic light-sensitive compounds that are exposed selectively to light, whereupon they become toxic to targeted malignant and other diseased cells.

One of the treatments is using blue light with aminolevulinic acid for the treatment of actinic keratosis. This is not a U.S. FDA-approved treatment for acne vulgaris.

Light boxes 

The production of the hormone melatonin, a sleep regulator, is inhibited by light and permitted by darkness as registered by photosensitive ganglion cells in the retina. To some degree, the reverse is true for serotonin, which has been linked to mood disorders. Hence, for the purpose of manipulating melatonin levels or timing, light boxes providing very specific types of artificial illumination to the retina of the eye are effective.

Light therapy uses either a light box which emits up to 10,000 lux of light at a specified distance, much brighter than a customary lamp, or a lower intensity of specific wavelengths of light from the blue (460 nm) to the green (525 nm) areas of the visible spectrum.  A 1995 study showed that green light therapy at doses of 350 lux produces melatonin suppression and phase shifts equivalent to 10,000 lux white light therapy, but another study published in May 2010 suggests that the blue light often used for SAD treatment should perhaps be replaced by green or white illumination, because of a possible involvement of the cones in melatonin suppression.

Risks and complications

Ultraviolet 
Ultraviolet light causes progressive damage to human skin and erythema even from small doses. This is mediated by genetic damage, collagen damage, as well as destruction of vitamin A and vitamin C in the skin and free radical generation. Ultraviolet light is also known to be a factor in formation of cataracts. Ultraviolet radiation exposure is strongly linked to incidence of skin cancer.

Visible light 
Optical radiation of any kind with enough intensity can cause damage to the eyes and skin including photoconjunctivitis and photokeratitis. Researchers have questioned whether limiting blue light exposure could reduce the risk of age-related macular degeneration. According to the American Academy of Ophthalmology, there is no scientific evidence showing that exposure to blue light emitting devices result in eye damage. According to Harriet Hall, blue light exposure is reported to suppress the production of melatonin, which affects our body's circadian rhythm and can decrease sleep quality. It is reported that bright light therapy may activate the production of reproductive hormones, such as testosterone, luteinizing hormone, follicle-stimulating hormone, and estradiol.

Modern phototherapy lamps used in the treatment of seasonal affective disorder and sleep disorders either filter out or do not emit ultraviolet light and are considered safe and effective for the intended purpose, as long as photosensitizing drugs are not being taken at the same time and in the absence of any existing eye conditions. Light therapy is a mood altering treatment, and just as with drug treatments, there is a possibility of triggering a manic state from a depressive state, causing anxiety and other side effects. While these side effects are usually controllable, it is recommended that patients undertake light therapy under the supervision of an experienced clinician, rather than attempting to self-medicate.

Contraindications to light therapy for seasonal affective disorder include conditions that might render the eyes more vulnerable to phototoxicity, tendency toward mania, photosensitive skin conditions, or use of a photosensitizing herb (such as St. John's wort) or medication. Patients with porphyria should avoid most forms of light therapy. Patients on certain drugs such as methotrexate or chloroquine should use caution with light therapy as there is a chance that these drugs could cause porphyria.

Side effects of light therapy for sleep phase disorders include jumpiness or jitteriness, headache, eye irritation and nausea. Some non-depressive physical complaints, such as poor vision and skin rash or irritation, may improve with light therapy.

History 

Many ancient cultures practiced various forms of heliotherapy, including people of Ancient Greece, Ancient Egypt, and Ancient Rome. The Inca, Assyrian and early Germanic peoples also worshipped the sun as a health bringing deity. Indian medical literature dating to 1500 BCE describes a treatment combining herbs with natural sunlight to treat non-pigmented skin areas. Buddhist literature from about 200 CE and 10th-century Chinese documents make similar references.

The Faroese physician Niels Finsen is believed to be the father of modern phototherapy. He developed the first artificial light source for this purpose.  Finsen used short wavelength light to treat lupus vulgaris, a skin infection caused by Mycobacterium tuberculosis. He thought that the beneficial effect was due to ultraviolet light killing the bacteria, but recent studies showed that his lens and filter system did not allow such short wavelengths to pass through, leading instead to the conclusion that light of approximately 400 nanometers generated reactive oxygen that would kill the bacteria. Finsen also used red light to treat smallpox lesions. He received the Nobel Prize in Physiology or Medicine in 1903. Scientific evidence for some of his treatments is lacking, and later eradication of smallpox and development of antibiotics for tuberculosis rendered light therapy obsolete for these diseases. In the early 20th-century light therapy was promoted by Auguste Rollier and John Harvey Kellogg. In 1924, Caleb Saleeby founded The Sunlight League.

From the late nineteenth century until the early 1930s, light therapy was considered an effective and mainstream medical therapy in the UK for conditions such as varicose ulcer, 'sickly children' and a wide range of other conditions. Controlled trials by the medical scientist Dora Colebrook, supported by the Medical Research Council, indicated that light therapy was not effective for such a wide range of conditions.

See also 
 Blood irradiation therapy
 Chromotherapy
 Crib A'Glow
 Free-running sleep
 Low level laser therapy
 Photodynamic therapy
 Sun tanning
 UV-B lamps

References 

Natural Light Therapy Significantly accelerates Antidepressants Response.
The Canadian Review of Affective Disorder, vol. 5, No 4, Autumn 1995.
Khaled Mohamed, M.D.: Gregory Asnis, M.D.

External links 

 Our Friend, the Sun: Images of Light Therapeutics from the Osler Library Collection, c. 1901–1944. Digital exhibition by the Osler Library of the History of Medicine, McGill University

 
Psoriasis
Circadian rhythm
Acne treatments
Treatment of bipolar disorder
Neonatology